Dhaka University is the oldest university in Bangladesh. It was established in 1921. Since its establishment, 26 academic scholars and educationalists have taken responsibility of the University of Dhaka as the Vice Chancellor. The present Vice Chancellor is Professor Md. Akhtaruzzaman.

First Indian Muslim Vice Chancellor of this university was Sir Ahmad Fazlur Rahman. After him a famous historian Professor R. C. Majumdar took over the responsibility. Prof. Sayed Moazzem Hossain was the first student of Dhaka University to become the Vice Chancellor.

In March 1971, Justice Abu Sayeed Chowdhury was the Vice Chancellor but he was in Geneva at that time to attend the UN Human Rights Commission summit. He became fed up seeing news in a newspaper about the death of two students of Dhaka University. He resigned from his duties sending a letter to the educational secretary of East Pakistan via the Pakistan Embassy. In that letter he wrote, "I don't find it logical to act as the Vice Chancellor while my unarmed students were killed. So, I resigned." The Mujibnagar government then assigned Justice Sayeed as the “Special representative of the expatriate government”. On 19 July, the military forces of Pakistan made D. Syed Sajjad Hussain the Vice Chancellor of Dhaka University who was the Vice Chancellor of Rajshahi University. D. Hasan Zaman & D. Meher Ali assisted him.

List of vice chancellors

See also 
 History of the University of Dhaka
 Liberation War of Bangladesh

References

External links 

 Dhaka University

Vice-Chancellors of the University of Dhaka
Vice-Chancellors of universities in Bangladesh